Warfield-Dye Residence, also known as "Wayside," or "Warfield House," is a historic home located at Elkins, Randolph County, West Virginia.  It was built in 1900–1901, and is a large -story brick-and-wood-shingle dwelling in the Queen Anne style.  It is topped by a hipped roof with dormers and two-story bay. It features a large wraparound porch with wooden rail, Tuscan order column supports, and a balustrade along the roof edge.  The house was built by Harry R. Warfield, son-in-law of Senator Henry G. Davis across from "Graceland".

It was listed on the National Register of Historic Places in 1997.

References

Houses on the National Register of Historic Places in West Virginia
Queen Anne architecture in West Virginia
Houses completed in 1901
Houses in Randolph County, West Virginia
National Register of Historic Places in Randolph County, West Virginia